Andrea Jean James (born January 16, 1967) is an American transgender rights activist, film producer, and blogger.

Education
James grew up in Franklin, Indiana, and attended Wabash College, where she majored in English, Latin, and Greek. After graduating in 1989, she obtained an M.A. in English language and literature from the University of Chicago.

Career
After college, James worked in advertising, first for several years at the Chicago Tribune, then for a decade at DDB Chicago. It was while working there that she transitioned. She became involved in consumer activism, with an interest in medical and academic fraud. In 1996 she created Transsexual Road Map, a consumer website for the transgender community, and later set up HairFacts and HairTell, a website and discussion forum about hair removal.

James moved to Los Angeles in 2003 and co-founded Deep Stealth Productions with her roommate, author and entertainer Calpernia Addams, to create content marketed to transgender people. They filmed an instructional video, Finding Your Female Voice, to offer voice coaching to trans women, and in 2004 produced and performed in the first all-transgender cast of The Vagina Monologues, debuting a new piece created by Eve Ensler for the occasion. James was also a co-producer of and appeared in Beautiful Daughters, a documentary film about the event.

In 2004 James founded the nonprofit GenderMedia Foundation. The following year she was a script consultant for Transamerica (2005), helping actress Felicity Huffman prepare for her role as a trans woman. She appeared in the HBO documentary Middle Sexes: Redefining He and She (2005), and in 2007 directed a 7-minute film, Casting Pearls. She was a consulting producer for, and appeared in, the reality-dating television series Transamerican Love Story on the Logo digital channel in 2008. In 2009 she directed another short film, Transproofed.

James was appointed in 2007 to the Board of Directors of TransYouth Family Allies, a nonprofit that supports transgender youth and their families, and in 2008 to the Board of Directors of Outfest, where she was involved in the restoration of the documentary Queens at Heart. In 2012 she co-founded Thought Moment Media. She directed the 2015 Showtime concert film Alec Mapa: Baby Daddy.

Writing and activism

James writes about consumer rights, technology, pop culture, and LGBT rights. She has contributed to Boing Boing, QuackWatch, eMedicine, The Advocate, The Huffington Post and Wikipedia.

Together with Lynn Conway and Deirdre McCloskey, James was a driving figure in protests—described in 2007 as "one of the most organized and unified examples of transgender activism seen to date"—against J. Michael Bailey's book The Man Who Would Be Queen (2003). In the book, Bailey argues that there are two forms of transsexualism: one a variant of male homosexuality, and the other a male sexual interest in having a female body, a taxonomy critics see as inaccurate and damaging. James argued that the book is a cure narrative, framed by one case report about a six-year-old child, that exemplifies the academic exploitation of transgender people.

The dispute became heated when James posted a page on her website containing photographs of Bailey's children, alongside sexually explicit captions that quoted or parodied material in Bailey's book. Bailey accused her of harassment, as did Alice Dreger, a colleague of Bailey's at Northwestern University; Dreger tried to stop James from speaking at the campus about the controversy. James responded that the page was intended to echo what she saw as Bailey's disrespect toward gender variant children.

See also
 List of Wikipedia people

References

External links
 
 
 "Andrea James", The Huffington Post.
 James, Andrea (December 3, 2007). "Don't Tick Off Trans". The Advocate.

1967 births
American non-fiction writers
LGBT producers
Living people
American LGBT rights activists
LGBT people from Indiana
Transgender actresses
Transgender writers
University of Chicago alumni
Wabash College alumni
Wikipedia people
Writers from Indiana
People from Franklin, Indiana
Film producers from Indiana
21st-century LGBT people